The Stura di Ovada is a  stream of Liguria and Piedmont (Italy); it is the main tributary of the Orba.

Geography 
The stream rises from monte Orditano (Ceranesi municipality), in the Ligurian Apennine, with the name Sturetta (little Stura). After Piani di Praglia in Mele municipality it receives Rio di Fregeu from left hand assuming the name of Stura. In this brief part of its course the Stura marks the border between the regions of Piemonte and Liguria, and the right part of its valley is encompassed in the Capanne di Marcarolo Natural Regional Park. Leaving the border it flows eastward in Liguria but, not faraway from  Passo del Turchino, turns North and reaches Masone and Campo Ligure receiving from the right hand its main tributaries, Rio Vezzulla and Torrente Ponzema. Crossing Rossiglione the Stura divides the town in Rossiglione Superiore (Upper Rossigline)  and Rossiglione Inferiore (Lower Rossiglione). A couple of kilometres downstream it enters Piedmont between Belforte Monferrato and Ovada. It joins  the Orba near the northern border of Ovada, at around 170 m.a.s.l.

Main tributaries 

Stura di Ovada main tributaries are:
 right hand:
 rio Vezzulla (12,12 km²),
 torrente Ponzema (13,16 km²),
 rio Angassino (4,02 km²),
 rio Berlino (13,58 km²),
 left hand:
 rio Masone (8,35 km²),
 rio Masca (11,05 km²),
 rio Gargassa (16,19 km²).

Sports 

The stream is considered suitable for angling trouts. Some parts of the Stura can be covered by canoe or kayak.

See also 

 Parco naturale delle Capanne di Marcarolo
 Cascata del Serpente

References

Rivers of Italy
Rivers of the Province of Alessandria
Rivers of the Province of Genoa
Rivers of the Apennines